

The Aboriginal Legal Rights Movement (ALRM) is an ATSILS (Aboriginal and Torres Strait Islander Legal Services centre) in South Australia, providing pro bono legal services to Aboriginal and Torres Strait Islander peoples in the state. Its headquarters are in Adelaide, with branch offices in Ceduna, Port Augusta and Port Lincoln. It an independent organisation governed by a board of all Aboriginal Australians, which also acts as a lobby group to advocate for justice for Aboriginal people as well as providing programs which aim to address issues which raise the likelihood of Aboriginal people encountering the criminal justice system.

ALRM was established in 1972, after a number of Aboriginal and Torres Strait Islander elders got together with the aim of developing specific legal services for Indigenous Australians, who were being poorly treated by the criminal justice system, including experiencing police brutality. They also advocated for land rights and campaigned against racial discrimination. The Aboriginal Community Centre Inc. and the Council of Aboriginal Women of South Australia were instrumental in the founding, and the ALRM was incorporated in 1973, receiving  in Commonwealth government funding via the Department of Aboriginal Affairs.

In 2017, ALRM became a company limited by guarantee, which provides the opportunity to diversify its business and possibly become more self-supporting.

Since 2012, Narungga woman Cheryl Axleby has been CEO of the organisation. 60 staff members are employed across ALRM, and its network of regional offices enable it to support people living in the remote APY Lands as well as elsewhere in South Australia. It represents 21 major language groups across the state.

The motto of the organisation is "Justice Without Prejudice", with its vision stated as "To pursue social justice, equality, and wellbeing for the Aboriginal peoples of South Australia, especially for those Aboriginal people who are detained in police custody or imprisoned". To this end, representatives of ALRM sit on various committees and liaise with government departments and others, including the Department for Correctional Services and South Australia Police and the Attorney General's Department. They try to explain the impact of various laws on Aboriginal people, and the cultural differences compared with non-Indigenous people. The 2020 Black Lives Matter movement in the US once again cast light on Aboriginal deaths in custody, an issue pursued by ALRM. CEO Axleby says that she would like to see a huge reduction in the numbers of Indigenous people in the justice system and the numbers of children being removed from their families under child protection policies implemented by Families SA.

 ALRM is funded by the federal government, the Attorney-General of South Australia, the federal Attorney-General's Department, the SA Department of the Premier and Cabinet and other government departments. Private sponsors include the Commonwealth Bank and the Wyatt Trust.

Custody Notification Service
On 1 July 2020, the Attorney-General of South Australia, Vickie Chapman, announced that the state government would implement a formal Custody Notification Service (CNS), after Aboriginal Affairs Labor spokesperson Kyam Maher had written to Premier Steven Marshall in June saying that he would introduce a Bill to parliament to legally mandate the service. This would legally require SAPOL to notify the ALRM when an Aboriginal person enters custody. This had been done informally for some time, but the legal requirement would "help to ensure Aboriginal people receive culturally appropriate well-being support and basic legal advice as soon as possible after being taken into custody". Mandating the measure would also mean that if an officer refuses or fails to comply, they "may be subject to disciplinary proceedings" under the Police Complaints and Discipline Act 2016. The move was welcomed by ALRM, which had been lobbying for it for years. The Summary Offences (Custody Notification Service) Variation Regulations 2020 was gazetted on 2 July 2020.

References

Further reading
 PDF

External links

1972 establishments in Australia
Legal organisations based in Australia
Indigenous Australians in South Australia
South Australia law
Organizations established in 1972